McLaren Vale is a closed railway station in Adelaide, South Australia. It was a ground level stopping place during the passenger transport days of this line and was an unattended crossing station after 1957. The station yard was noted for its impressive avenue of giant pine trees.

The stop is now disused, the entire Willunga railway line having been dismantled in 1972 and more recently replaced by the Coast to Vines Rail Trail.

References

Australian Railway Historical Society Bulletin No 336, October 1965

Maclaren Vale railway station